Ahmet Mahmut Ünlü (born February 27, 1965), known colloquially as Cübbeli Ahmet Hoca, is a Turkish imam and hafiz. He is a follower of Mahmut Ustaosmanoğlu in İsmailağa. His controversial views are often reported by the Turkish press.

Biography

Early life and education: 1965–1980 
Ahmet Mahmut Ünlü was born in Fatih, Istanbul, on 27 February 1965 to Yusuf Ünlü, a factory owner, and his wife Rabia. His surname, Ünlü, means "famous". In his childhood years, Ünlü was wearing a Cassock. He started his education when he was 3 years old. He preached in big mosques like Yavuz Selim while he was 14 years old.

Later life: 1980–present 
Ünlü reportedly did not have to do military service after being diagnosed as diabetic.

His silsila in Khalid’îyyah tarīqah and İsmailağa jamia

Personal life 
Mahmut Ünlü is married and has eight children.

References

1965 births
Living people
Turkish Sufis
People from Fatih
Turkish people of Uzbekistani descent